This is a list of seasons completed by Modo Hockey of the Elitserien. This list documents the records and playoff results for all seasons that Modo Hockey has competed in since 1975. The league leader indicates the most wins, fewest losses, most goals scored, or fewest goals allowed.

Seasons

Prior to Elitserien

Elitserien

Kvalserien Results

References

Modo Hockey